Statistics of Japanese Regional Leagues for the 1993 season.

Champions list

League standings

Hokkaido

Tohoku

Kanto

Hokushinetsu

Tokai

Kansai

Chugoku

Shikoku

Kyushu

Japanese Regional Leagues seasons
3